Great Tower Street, originally known just as Tower Street, is a street in the City of London, the historic nucleus and modern financial centre of London. It forms an eastern continuation of Eastcheap starting at Idol Lane, and leads towards Byward Street and Tower Hill. On Byward Street, opposite Great Tower Street, is the historic church All Hallows-by-the-Tower.

A public house called the Czar's Head used to stand at No. 48, so named because Peter the Great used to drink there when he was learning shipbuilding at Deptford. Somewhere on Tower Street in 1688, Edward Lloyd opened Lloyd's Coffee House, where the insurance market Lloyd's of London originated. In 1691, Lloyd relocated his shop to nearby Lombard Street; today Lloyd's is based on Lime Street.

Prior to boundary changes in 2003, Great Tower Street formed the centre of the City ward of Tower. Today it lies mostly in Billingsgate ward, but a short portion of the easternmost end of the street is still within Tower ward.

Great Tower Street is home to a number of restaurants and offices, including the southern entrance to No. 3 Minster Court, and Plantation Place South.

It formed part of the marathon course of the 2012 Olympic and Paralympic Games. The women's Olympic marathon took place on 5 August and the men's on 12 August. The Paralympic marathons were held on 9 September.

The nearest London Underground stations are Monument and Tower Hill and the closest mainline railway station is Fenchurch Street.

References 

Streets in the City of London
Odonyms referring to a building